Roma or ROMA may refer to:

Places

Australia
 Roma, Queensland, a town
 Roma Airport
 Roma Courthouse
 Electoral district of Roma, defunct
 Town of Roma, defunct town, now part of the Maranoa Regional Council
Roma Street, Brisbane, a street in Queensland
Roma Street busway station
Roma Street Parkland, park in Brisbane, Queensland
Roma Street railway station, a station in Brisbane, Queensland

Brazil
 Mata Roma, a municipality in the state of Maranhão
 Roma Negra, a nickname of the city of Salvador, Bahia

Italy
 Rome or Roma, the capital of Italy
A.S. Roma, one of the football clubs of Rome
 Roma Tre University (founded in 1992)
 Esposizione Universale Roma or EUR, a residential and business district
 Ancient Rome or Roma

Lesotho
 Roma, Lesotho,  in the Maseru District

Mexico
 Colonia Roma, a neighbourhood in Mexico City

Peru
 Roma, Peru, a town in La Libertad Region

Portugal
 Roma (Lisbon Metro), a Green Line station on Avenida de Roma

Romania
 Roma, Botoșani, a commune

Spain
 La Roma, a fossil site in Aragon
 Roma (Requena), a village in Valencia

Sweden
 Roma, Gotland, a town

United States
 Roma, Texas, a town
 Roma Independent School District

Names
 Roma (given name), a female given name
 Roma (surname), a surname (and list of people with the name)
 Roman (given name), or Roma, a male given name
 Roman (surname), a surname (and list of people with the name)

People
 The Roma people or Romani people, an ethnic group living mostly in Europe and the Americas
 Roma called Roy, ancient Egyptian High Priest of Amun
 Sister Roma or Michael Williams (born 1962), American drag performer and director
 Roma (footballer, born 1979), born Paulo Marcel Pereira Merabet, Brazilian football forward
 Roma (footballer, born 1985), born Juliano Laurentino dos Santos, Brazilian football winger

Film and television
 Roma (1972 film), an Italian film by Federico Fellini
 Roma (2004 film), an Argentinian film by Adolfo Aristarain
 Roma (2018 film), a Mexican film by Alfonso Cuarón
 Roma (Don character), a fictional character in the Don film series

Books
 Roma (novel), a 2007 novel by Steven Saylor about Ancient Rome
 Roma (comics), a Marvel comics character

Music
 Roma!, an American glam rock band

Musical pieces
 Roma Symphony (Bizet), a 19th-century symphony by Georges Bizet
 Roma (opera), a 1912 opera by Jules Massenet
 Roma, a 1991 album by Terry Ronald
 "Roma" (song), a 2005 song by Cameron Cartio

Companies
 Roma Revolving Restaurant, in Durban, South Africa
 Tony Roma's, an American chain restaurant

Political organizations
 Party of the Roma, a political party in Romania
 Roma Democratic Social Party, a political party in the Czech Republic
 Roma Party, a political party in Serbia

Transportation
 Roma (airship), a US army airship (Italian ex-T34) which crashed on February 21, 1922
 Italian ironclad Roma, an armoured steam frigate commissioned in 1865
 Italian battleship Roma (1907), a predreadnought battleship of the Regina Elena class
 Italian battleship Roma (1940), a battleship of the Vittorio Veneto class
 SS Roma (1926)
 MV Doulos or SS Roma
 Ferrari Roma, grand touring sports car manufactured by Italian automobile manufacturer Ferrari

Sports

Sports teams
 A.S. Roma, a football team in Rome, Italy
 A.S. Roma (Superleague Formula team), auto racing team associated with above
 A.S. Roma Futsal, futsal team associated with above
 Dallas Roma F.C., a soccer team in Dallas, Texas, United States
 M. Roma Volley, a volleyball team in Rome, Italy
 Roma Esporte Apucarana, a football team in Apucarana, Paraná, Brazil
 Roma S.C., a defunct soccer team in Paterson, New Jersey, United States
 Roma United, a football club in the Cayman Islands 
 Rugby Roma Olimpic, a rugby team in Rome, Italy

Sporting events
 Premio Roma, a horse race in Rome, Italy
 Roma Cup, a horse race in Perth, Western Australia, Australia
 Roma Golf Open, a golf tournament in Rome, Italy
 Roma Masters, a defunct golf tournament in Rome, Italy
 Roma Open, a tennis tournament in Rome, Italy

Other uses
 Roma (mythology), a Roman deity
 472 Roma, an asteroid
 ROMA or Representational Oligonucleotide Microarray Analysis, a genomics technology
 Roma rice, an Italian cultivated variety of rice particularly suitable for risotto
 Roma tomato, a plum tomato commonly found in supermarkets
 ROMA Design Group, a San Francisco-based interdisciplinary design firm

See also

 
 Romas (disambiguation)
 Nova Roma (disambiguation)
 Rome (disambiguation)
Romaic
Romanus (disambiguation)
Aromanians
Romagna
Romagnol language
Romain (disambiguation)
Romaine (disambiguation)
Roman (disambiguation)
Romanesco (disambiguation)
Romanesque (disambiguation)
Romana (disambiguation)
Romand
Romandy
Romania (disambiguation)
Romanian (disambiguation)
Romanicus
Romance (disambiguation) 
Romanza (disambiguation)
Romance languages (Romanic)
Romanization (disambiguation)
Romano (disambiguation)
Romansh language
Rûm
Rumelia